Klaus-Jürgen Wrede (born 1963 in Meschede, North Rhine-Westphalia) is a German board game creator, the creator of the best-selling Carcassonne and Downfall of Pompeii.

Early life
Born to music-teacher parents in Meschede, Germany, Wrede grew up in the town of Arnsberg, Germany. He attended college in Cologne, learning music and theology.

Game career
While on a vacation Wrede created Carcassonne which was published in 2000 by Hans im Glück in German and Rio Grande Games in English.

As a child he played games such as Monopoly and chess.  He later played games such as Kremlin, Civilization, Age of Renaissance, Tikal, Ra, and Tigris and Euphrates.  His favorite game designers include Wolfgang Kramer, Reiner Knizia, Alan R. Moon, Klaus Teuber, Uwe Rosenberg, and Karl-Heinz Schmiel.

Personal life
Klaus-Jürgen Wrede lives near Cologne and teaches music and religious education.  His favorite music includes soul, Wagner, Sting, Brahms, U2 (not The Edge though), jazz, Supertramp, and Chopin.

External links

Klaus-Jürgen Wrede's personal website (German)
Interview with Klaus-Jürgen Wrede in Brettspillguiden

References

1963 births
Living people
People from Meschede
Board game designers
German schoolteachers